Abroskinsky is a rural locality (a khutor) in Mikhaylovskoye Rural Settlement of Uryupinsky District, Volgograd Oblast, Russia. The population was 49 as of 2010.

Geography 
The khutor is located in the forest steppe on the border of Khopyorsko-Buzulukskaya plain and flood plains of the Hopyor River, 26 km north of Uryupinsk (the district's administrative centre) by road. Sadkovsky is the nearest rural locality.

References 

Rural localities in Uryupinsky District